Joseph Caldwell (1773–1835) was an American mathematician.

Joseph or Joe Caldwell may also refer to:

Joseph Pearson Caldwell (1808–1853), American representative from North Carolina
Joe Caldwell (born 1941), American basketball player
Joe Caldwell (archaeologist) (1916–1973), American archaeologist